Film City may refer to 

 Film City, Mumbai
 Noida Film City
 Ramoji Film City, Hyderabad
 Prayag Film City, West Bengal